Marbán is a province in the Beni Department, Bolivia. The capital is Loreto.

Places of interest
 Cachimbo Lake
 San Jorge Lake
 Isiboro Sécure National Park and Indigenous Territory

References

Provinces of Beni Department